Havlíčkův Brod District is a district in the Vysočina Region of the Czech Republic. Its capital is the town of Havlíčkův Brod.

Administrative division
Havlíčkův Brod District is divided into three administrative districts of municipalities with extended competence: Havlíčkův Brod, Chotěboř and Světlá nad Sázavou.

List of municipalities
Towns are marked in bold and market towns in italics:

Bačkov -
Bartoušov -
Bělá -
Bezděkov -
Bojiště -
Boňkov -
Borek -
Břevnice -
Čachotín -
Čečkovice -
Česká Bělá -
Chotěboř -
Chrtníč -
Chřenovice -
Číhošť -
Dlouhá Ves -
Dolní Krupá -
Dolní Město -
Dolní Sokolovec -
Druhanov -
Golčův Jeníkov -
Habry -
Havlíčkova Borová -
Havlíčkův Brod -
Herálec -
Heřmanice -
Hněvkovice -
Horní Krupá -
Horní Paseka -
Hradec -
Hurtova Lhota -
Jedlá -
Jeřišno -
Jilem -
Jitkov -
Kámen -
Kamenná Lhota -
Klokočov -
Knyk -
Kochánov -
Kojetín -
Kouty -
Kozlov -
Kožlí -
Kraborovice -
Krásná Hora -
Krátká Ves -
Krucemburk -
Kunemil -
Květinov -
Kyjov -
Kynice -
Lány -
Ledeč nad Sázavou -
Leškovice -
Leština u Světlé -
Libice nad Doubravou -
Lípa -
Lipnice nad Sázavou -
Lučice -
Malčín -
Maleč -
Michalovice -
Modlíkov -
Nejepín -
Nová Ves u Chotěboře -
Nová Ves u Leštiny -
Nová Ves u Světlé -
Okrouhlice -
Okrouhlička -
Olešenka -
Olešná -
Ostrov -
Oudoleň -
Ovesná Lhota -
Pavlov -
Podmoklany -
Podmoky -
Pohled -
Pohleď -
Přibyslav -
Příseka -
Prosíčka -
Radostín -
Rozsochatec -
Rušinov -
Rybníček -
Sázavka -
Sedletín -
Skorkov -
Šlapanov -
Skryje -
Skuhrov -
Slavětín -
Slavíkov -
Slavníč -
Sloupno -
Služátky -
Sobíňov -
Štoky -
Stříbrné Hory -
Světlá nad Sázavou -
Tis -
Trpišovice -
Uhelná Příbram -
Úhořilka -
Úsobí -
Vepříkov -
Veselý Žďár -
Věž -
Věžnice -
Vilémov -
Vilémovice -
Víska -
Vlkanov -
Vysoká -
Ždírec -
Ždírec nad Doubravou -
Žižkovo Pole -
Zvěstovice

Geography

A hilly landscape is typical for the district. The territory extends into four geomorphological mesoregions: Upper Sázava Hills (most of the territory), Křemešník Highlands (southwest), Iron Mountains (northeast) and Křižanov Highlands (small part in the east).

The most important river is the Sázava, which flows across the whole district from east to west. The largest body of water is the Řeka pond. Notable is also Švihov Reservoir, which lies on the western border of the district.

Two protected landscape areas extends into the district in the east: Iron Mountains and Žďárské vrchy.

Demographics

Most populated municipalities

Economy
The largest employers with its headquarters in Havlíčkův Brod District and at least 500 employers are:

Transport
The D1 motorway from Prague to Brno passes through the southern part of the district.

Sights

The most important monuments in the district, protected as national cultural monuments, are:
Birthplace of Karel Havlíček Borovský in Havlíčkova Borová
Lipnice nad Sázavou Castle
Štáfl's cottage in Havlíčkův Brod
Glassworks in Tasice
Michal's farm in Pohleď

The best-preserved settlements, protected as monument zones, are:
Chotěboř
Havlíčkova Borová
Havlíčkův Brod
Ledeč nad Sázavou
Petrovice
Přibyslav

The most visited tourist destination is the Lipnice nad Sázavou Castle.

References

External links

Havlíčkův Brod District profile on the Czech Statistical Office's website

 
Districts of the Czech Republic